Sparianthina is a genus of huntsman spiders that was first described by Nathan Banks in 1929.

Species
 it contains eleven species, found in Central America, Guyana, Colombia, Venezuela, and on Trinidad and Tobago:
Sparianthina adisi Jäger, Rheims & Labarque, 2009 – Venezuela
Sparianthina boyaca (Rheims, 2021) – Colombia
Sparianthina deltshevi Jäger, Rheims & Labarque, 2009 – Venezuela
Sparianthina gaita Rheims, 2011 – Venezuela
Sparianthina milleri (Caporiacco, 1955) – Venezuela
Sparianthina parang Rheims, 2011 – Trinidad and Tobago
Sparianthina pumilla (Keyserling, 1880) – Colombia
Sparianthina rufescens (Mello-Leitão, 1940) – Guyana
Sparianthina saaristoi Jäger, Rheims & Labarque, 2009 – Venezuela
Sparianthina selenopoides Banks, 1929 (type) – Costa Rica, Panama
Sparianthina soca (Rheims, 2021) – Trinidad and Tobago

See also
 List of Sparassidae species

References

Araneomorphae genera
Sparassidae
Spiders of Central America
Spiders of South America
Taxa named by Nathan Banks